The Gardnerville Elementary School, at 1290 Toler Ave. in Gardnerville, Nevada, is a historic Classical Revival-style school that is listed on the U.S. National Register of Historic Places.

It was built in 1928, and, as of 2008, was still used as a school, though other buildings on the property besides the NRHP-listed one exist.

It was listed on the National Register in 2008, along with Minden Elementary School.

References

External links 
Gardnerville Elementary School

National Register of Historic Places in Douglas County, Nevada
Neoclassical architecture in Nevada
Schools in Douglas County, Nevada
School buildings on the National Register of Historic Places in Nevada